Barciany is a village in Kętrzyn County, Warmian-Masurian Voivodeship, in northern Poland, close to the border with the Kaliningrad Oblast of Russia. It is the seat of the gmina (administrative district) called Gmina Barciany.

Its name originates from the name of an Old Prussian tribe, the Bartians. An Ordensburg was erected in 1325, but stone was not used until 1377.

After Germany's defeat in World War II in 1945, the town was part of the region that became part of Poland under the terms of the Potsdam Agreement.

The village has a population of 1,100.

Notable people 
 Hermann Gemmel (1813 in Barten – 1868 in Königsberg) was a German architect, painter, and art teacher at the Kunstakademie Königsberg.

References

Villages in Kętrzyn County
Castles of the Teutonic Knights